Peach is a tree, and the fruit produced by that tree.

Peach may also refer to:

People
 Peach (singer), an American blues and jazz artist
 Peach (surname), including a list of people with the surname

Arts, entertainment, and media

Music

Groups
 Peach (band), a British metal band 1991–1994
 Peach (pop band), a British band 1995–1998

Songs
 "Peach" (IU song), a song by South Korean singer-songwriter and actress IU
 "Peach" (Prince song), by Prince, 1993
 "Peach", a song on "Peach/Heart", a 2007 double A-sided single by Ai Otsuka
 *"Peach!!", the A-side single on "Peach!!/Heart of Xmas", a single from Masaharu Fukuyama

Other uses in arts, entertainment, and media
 Princess Peach, a character in Nintendo's Mario franchise
 10 Peach, an Australian television channel
 Peach, a starfish in the Finding Nemo franchise
 Big Buck Bunny (code named "Project Peach"), an open content short film by the Blender Foundation
 Peach Landis, a recurring character in the U.S. TV series 2 Broke Girls

Other uses
 Peach (airline), a low-cost airline based in Japan
 Peach (color), the pale pinkish-orange color of the fruit of the Peach tree
 Peach (social network), a social network
 Peach County, Georgia, a county in the United States
 Pan-European Automated Clearing House, or PEACH

See also
 Impeachment, a process in which an official is accused of unlawful activity
 Peaches (disambiguation)
 Pietsch, a surname